Grigorovich M-9 (alternative designation ShCh M-9, sometimes also Shchetinin M-9) was a Russian World War I-era biplane flying boat, developed from the M-5 by Grigorovich.

The first M-9 was ready in 1915 and its maiden flight was carried out on January 9, 1916 at Baku. On September 17, 1916, the test pilot Jan Nagórski became the first to make a loop with a flying boat.

During the Russian Civil War, M-9s participated in the air defence of Baku, dropping approximately 6,000 kg of bombs and 160 kg of flechettes. The aircraft also carried out photo reconnaissance, artillery spotting and air combat sorties.

The M-9 was also used for the first experiments on sea shelve study, participating in the finding of new oil fields near Baku.

Nine M-9s were captured by Finland during the Russian Civil War. One was flown by a Russian officer to Antrea on April 10, 1918. It sank the following day during type evaluation. Eight more were taken over at the airfields at Åland and Turku. The aircraft were used until 1922 by the Finnish Air Force.

Operators
 
Imperial Russian Air Service
White Army

Finnish Air Force

Soviet Air Force

Specifications (M-9)

See also

References

Bibliography

Biplanes
Single-engined pusher aircraft
Flying boats
1910s Russian military reconnaissance aircraft
Military aircraft of World War I
M-09
Aircraft first flown in 1916